Tortum is a town and district of Erzurum Province in the Eastern Anatolia Region of Turkey. The population is 4,507 as of 2010. The current mayor is Muammer Yiğider from the Great Unity Party (BBP).

History
Tortum was part of the area known as Diaueni, Tayk or Tao and was ruled by Hayasa-Azzians, Diauehi, Urartians, Iberians, Armenians, Romans, Persians and Byzantines. Tortum was a part of some proto-Armenian states (Hayasa-Azzi; Urartu), proto-Georgian Kingdom of Iberia (4th - 2rd centuries BC) and Kingdom of Greater Armenia (2nd century BC - 5th century). Between the 9th and 16th century it was part of the Kingdom of the Iberians, Kingdom of Georgia and Georgian principality of Samtskhe-Saatabago. It was first an Ottoman vassal in the early 16th century and was annexed in 1550. The area of Tortum  was contested by the Safavids and the Ottoman Empire in the 16th-17th century but remained Ottoman after 1625. Georgians and Armenians made up the vast majority of the population in Tortum. During Georgian rule, half of the ethnic Armenian population became Chalcedonians and joined the Georgian Orthodox church, while the rest of the Armenians remained part of the Armenian church. Armenian cleric Hakop Karnetsi recorded in the 1650s that a man named Mullah Jaffar took census and placed heavy taxes in the region, causing the Armenian Chalcedonians to convert en-masse to Islam. Tortum was a sanjak in Erzurum Eyalet. The region was in the early Ottoman period largely Christian but acquired a Muslim majority in the mid 18th century, as Georgian population fled in inner provinces of Georgia. During World War I, Ottoman troops crossed Tortum in the disastrous Battle of Sarikamish. Then the Russians occupied the town and held it between 1915 and 1917. After the February revolution of 1917 they left it to the Armenians. The Ottoman army advanced some time later and captured Tortum on 16 March 1918. The town has a ruined citadel.

The Muslim Armenians continued to speak Armenian well into early the 19th century when they were Turkified.

Economy

As of 1920, Tortum was producing coal.

See also 
Cağ kebabı
Khakhuli Monastery
Tortum Waterfall

References

External links 

Populated places in Erzurum Province
Historical regions of Georgia (country)
Districts of Erzurum Province